The following is a list of members of the Montgomery County Council since its creation.

Current members
The members of the County Council as of 2022 are:

Past members
Background colors indicate party:

1949-70: Council–Manager form of government

1971–present: Council–Executive form of government
The Council has expanded twice under this form of government. Two new at-large seats were added in 1990 after having been previously approved of by voters in the 1986 election. Two new district seats were added after having been previously approved of by voters in the 2020 election.

Past presidents
The position of County Council President was first created in the seventh term of the council, in 1970. The position is re-elected each year by the members of the council, who also vote for a Vice President simultaneously.

Notes

References

External links
 
 Esther Gelman papers, at the University of Maryland libraries. Gelman was a member of the Montgomery County Council from 1974 to 1987 and its first female president.

Montgomery County Council
maryland